Doris nucleola is a species of sea slug, a dorid nudibranch, a marine gastropod mollusc in the family Dorididae.

Distribution
This species was described from the Sandwich Islands (Hawaiian Islands). It has been confused with Doris immonda and is considered unrecognisable by some authors.

References

Dorididae
Gastropods described in 1860